Westpoort (Western Gateway or Western Port) is a borough (stadsdeel) of Amsterdam, Netherlands. The borough covers the Port of Amsterdam, the main harbour and industrial area of the city, and is located in the north-western part of Amsterdam. It is divided in the industrial areas of Teleport, Sloterdijk areas I, II and II, De Heining and the harbour area (Havengebied).

While the borough has very few permanent residents, it serves as corporate headquarters of over 1,500 Dutch and foreign companies that operate in the Netherlands. Therefore, approximately 45,000 people commute to the area for work on workdays, making it the largest commuter destination within city limits.

 As a primarily business district, Westpoort does not have its own district committee like the other boroughs do. Instead, it is governed directly by the central municipal council, as a port and industrial park rather than a neighborhood.

The northern border of the area is formed by the North Sea Canal. The district borders the boroughs of West and Nieuw-West and the municipality of Haarlemmerliede en Spaarnwoude (including the town of Halfweg).

References

External links

 City of Amsterdam, Westpoort official site

Geography of Amsterdam
Western
Boroughs of Amsterdam
Industrial parks